Horst Kummeth (born 27 December 1956 in Forchheim, West Germany) is a German television actor, writer and director.

Selected filmography
 Derrick - Season 11, Episode 02: "Die Verführung" (1984)

External links

 http://www.horstkummeth.de/ 

1956 births
Living people
German male television actors
German male film actors
People from Forchheim
German television writers